Stomach, a concept from traditional Chinese medicine as distinct from the Western medical concept of stomach, is more a way of describing a set of interrelated parts than an anatomical organ.

The Stomach and its paired organ, the Spleen, are associated with the element of earth and the emotions of anxiety and stress.

See also
Zang-fu

References 

Traditional Chinese medicine